Užička Crna Gora ("Black Mountains of Užice") is a mountainous region in western Serbia around the town of Užice. To the east lies Šumadija; Užička Crna Gora borders to the region of Rudnik, which lies in Šumadija, however, the border between the two is unclear due to historical administrative changes.

References

Further reading

Geographical regions of Serbia
Geography of Šumadija and Western Serbia